Tetrarhanis onitshae, the Onitsha on-off, is a butterfly in the family Lycaenidae. It is found in eastern Nigeria. The habitat consists of primary forests.

References

Endemic fauna of Nigeria
Butterflies described in 1962
Poritiinae